Muhammad Syahmi bin Zamri (born 12 May 2000) is a Malaysian professional footballer who plays as a forward for Petaling Jaya City.

Club career

Petaling Jaya City
Syahmi signed a contract with Petaling Jaya City in December 2020. On 21 March 2021, he made his debut for the club in a 1–0 over Sri Pahang, and scored his first goal on 12 September in a 2–1 away victory against Selangor.

International career
Syahmi represented the Malaysian at the 2018 AFF U-19 Youth Championship and scored one goal along the tournament.

Career statistics

Club

References

External links
 

2000 births
Living people
People from Selangor
Felda United F.C. players
Petaling Jaya City FC players
Malaysian footballers
Malaysian people of Malay descent
Association football forwards
Malaysia Super League players
Malaysia youth international footballers